Abbakumtsevo is a rural locality (a selo) in Krasny Profintern of Nekrasovsky District, Yaroslavl Oblast, Russia. The population was 2 as of 2002. There are 6 streets.

Geography 
The village is located on the left bank of the Volga River, 31 km northwest of Nekrasovskoye (the district's administrative centre) by road. Igumnovo is the nearest rural locality.

References 

Rural localities in Yaroslavl Oblast
Nekrasovsky District